Kitsiputous, located in Enontekiö is one of the highest waterfalls in Finland.

The falls are located along the hiking trail leading to the Three Nations' Border Point. The waterfalls turn into frozen waterfalls during winter.

Waterfalls of Finland
Enontekiö
Landforms of Lapland (Finland)